Torun Eriksen (born 8 January 1977 in Lunde, Telemark) is a Norwegian jazz singer, whose musical talents first came to prominence as a music student at high school in Norway.

Eriksen was born in Lunde, Telemark. From the age of six, she sang in various gospel choirs, and by the age of 19 had become a featured soloist. With a background steeped in soul, jazz, pop, and through her choral experience she began writing her first compositions. A major influence was the world of jazz standards via the Real Book. After moving to Oslo in 1997, she enrolled at the Norwegian Institute for Stage and Studio.

Discography
 Glittercard (Jazzland, 2003)
 Prayers & Observations (Jazzland, 2005)
 Passage (Jazzland, 2010)
 Visits (Jazzland, 2013), with David Wallumrød (keyboards), Audun Erlien (bass) and Ola Hultgren (drums)
 Grand White Silk (Jazzland, 2016)

References

External links 

1977 births
Living people
Musicians from Lunde, Telemark
20th-century Norwegian women singers
20th-century Norwegian singers
21st-century Norwegian women singers
21st-century Norwegian singers
Jazzland Recordings (1997) artists
Norwegian women jazz singers
Norwegian jazz composers
Norwegian musical groups